NET FM is a Maltese radio station owned by Media.link Communications, the media arm of the Nationalist Party.

External links

References 

Radio stations in Malta
Nationalist Party (Malta) publications
Radio stations established in 1991